The Terrafugia TF-X is an autonomous flying car under development by Boston-based Terrafugia. The TF-X seats four passengers and uses an engine combined with two electric motors for propulsion. Unlike the previously proposed Transition, the TF-X is capable of vertical take-off and landing by extending its retractable wings attached with pusher propellers, while aerial thrust is provided by a ducted fan at the rear. It will be able to fit in a single car garage.

Powered by two plug-in hybrid 600-horsepower electric motors and a 300-horsepower fuel engine, the TF-X is planned to have a flight range of 500 miles  (805 km) with a cruising flight speed of 200 mph (322 km/h) without the need to refuel or recharge. Road speed is currently unknown.

Design and development

Terrafugia started development of the TF-X in 2013 and the updated design of the exterior was done in 2014 by Vedran Martinek, an Automotive Designer from Croatia. When in flight, the TF-X is effectively autonomous, with the computer able to navigate to a pre-specified landing zone—and pre-selected backup landing zones—by itself, although manual controls and overrides exist. Final landing must be approved by the pilot. The TF-X will also provide operators the choice to fly in either manual or automatic during flight with the ability to control the vehicle in a manner similar to steering the wheel of an automobile. Terrafugia claims that learning to drive the TF-X is likely to take five hours and will take substantially less time to learn how to safely operate than a traditional aircraft.

Safety features

The TF-X is expected to be capable of avoiding air traffic, bad weather, and restricted and tower-controlled airspace. For additional safety features, the TF-X would automatically land at the nearest airport if the operator becomes unresponsive. Additionally, if a TF-X operator declares an emergency, the authorities will be automatically notified of the situation and the TF-X can be landed in a non-approved landing zone. The TF-X also features a backup full vehicle parachute system that can be activated if the operator believes the vehicle is incapable of auto-landing.

Pricing

Pricing is expected to be upwards of £200,000 (roughly $300,000).

Specifications (TF-X)

See also
 Terrafugia Transition

References

External links
 YouTube Video

Roadable aircraft
Cars of the United States
Motor vehicles manufactured in the United States